This is a list of shopping malls in Metro Manila, the Philippines.

The first enclosed shopping mall in the metropolis was Crystal Arcade located along Escolta Street in the downtown district of Binondo. This art deco building designed by Andrés Luna de San Pedro also housed the Manila Stock Exchange and was the Philippines' first air-conditioned building inaugurated on June 1, 1932.

Prior to the Pacific War, Escolta Street was also home to the city's first standalone department stores, including H.E. Heacock, until then the largest department store in the Philippines, opening in 1900, and the Aguinaldo Department Store, the most premium store in the Philippines opening in 1921. Other notable stores in the 1920s and 1930s include the upscale La Puerta del Sol and Estrella del Norte.

The first shopping mall of the enclosed, automobile-centered design type was Ali Mall in suburban Quezon City which opened in 1976. This was followed by Harrison Plaza in Malate district which opened later that same year.

Major shopping centers
These super-regional supermalls each have over a hundred local and international stores and are anchored by at least one department store and supermarket or hypermarket. They are also the largest malls in Metro Manila which feature not just stores but also attractions: movie theaters, rides, skating rinks, bowling alleys and other recreational facilities. Each provides thousands of automobile parking spaces and are located mostly near rail stations and established business districts within the metropolis. These malls serve not only the Metro Manila and Greater Manila Area residents, but also local and foreign tourists.

Community malls
Community or regional shopping centers in Metro Manila are built around one department store or supermarket and are enclosed. These shopping centers are located mostly in suburban residential areas of the metropolis and typically cater to the basic shopping needs of area residents.

Lifestyle malls
Lifestyle centers in Metro Manila are located in upscale business districts and affluent areas like Makati, Ortigas Center, and Bonifacio Global City. Many of these boutique malls are open-air and are popular dining and entertainment venues for Manila's elite.

Strip malls
Strip malls consist mainly of food outlets and several stores and businesses sharing one parking lot. These casual dining and retail centers have become popular hangouts among young professionals in Manila.

Retail podiums
These retail centers are located within major office, hotel and residential buildings in business districts and townships around Metro Manila containing several dozen stores in the building's central atrium or podium.

Duty-free shopping centers
Located within a few miles of Ninoy Aquino International Airport, the Duty Free Philippines FiestaMall and Luxe Duty Free cater to the duty-free shopping needs of international travelers, tourists, and balikbayan people (Filipino nationals who are residents abroad).

Bargain malls and open-air shopping plazas
Bargain malls in Manila are popular among locals and tourists alike. These independent retailers are mostly housed in enclosed malls which often spill into surrounding streets. They sell everything from ready-to-wear clothes, electronic items to jewelries.

Under construction

Defunct

See also
List of shopping malls in the Philippines
List of largest shopping malls in the Philippines

References

Metro Manila
 
Metro Manila-related lists
Shopping malls in Manila